Tukon Chapel is a chapel located in Basco, Batanes.

References

Chapels in the Philippines